The Filmfare Best Action Award is given by the Filmfare magazine as part of its annual Filmfare Awards for Hindi films.

Although the awards started in 1954, the category was not started until 1993.

Superlatives
Most Awards
Sham Kaushal – 5
Tinnu Verma – 4
Allan Amin – 3
Bhiku Verma - 2
Akbar Bakshi – 2
Vijayan – 2
Tom Struthers - 2
Having won the award 5 times, Sham Kaushal holds the record for most wins in this category, followed by Tinnu Verma 4 wins, Allan Amin each with 3 wins each, and Bhiku Verma, Akbar Bakshi, Vijayan Master each with 2 wins each.

Awards

Here is a list of the award winners and the films for which they won.

See also 
 Filmfare Awards
 Bollywood
 Cinema of India

References

Action